Karl-Heinz Emig (born 29 July 1962 in Mannheim) is a German football coach and a former player.

Career
Emig spent three seasons in the Bundesliga with Hertha BSC and 1. FC Kaiserslautern.

Coaching career
In the 2002–03 season, he was a caretaker manager of 1. FC Kaiserslautern for eight days. Emig managed the under-17 youth team of 1. FC Kaiserslautern until 7 January 2010 and one day later, he announced he would begin to work in the future as assistant coach for Karlsruher SC.

References

External links
 

1962 births
Living people
German footballers
German football managers
Bundesliga players
2. Bundesliga players
SV Waldhof Mannheim players
Hertha BSC players
SV Darmstadt 98 players
1. FC Kaiserslautern players
SpVgg Unterhaching players
VfL Wolfsburg players
1. FC Kaiserslautern managers
Footballers from Mannheim
Association football midfielders
West German footballers